Karimganj Law College is a law school in Karimganj, Assam, India. Established in 1984, it offers a three-year LL.B. course affiliated to Assam University. The college is recognised by the Bar Council of India.

References

Law schools in Assam
Educational institutions established in 1984
1984 establishments in Assam
Universities and colleges in Assam
Colleges affiliated to Assam University